= Juan Harriet =

Argentine rancher and philanthropist

Juan Alberto Harriet
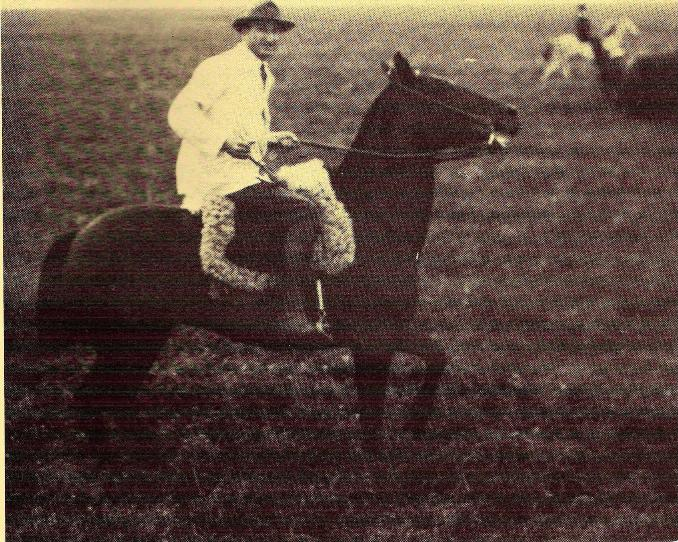
- Harriet
- Occupations: Rancher, businessman, philanthropist

Juan Alberto Harriet (1888–1975) was an Argentine rancher, agricultural businessman and philanthropist.

Reference works and library catalogues connect Harriet with cattle raising in the Argentine Pampas. In English-language sources, his public legacy is more clearly documented through philanthropy. Ann Helton Stromberg's Philanthropic Foundations in Latin America records the Fundación Juan Alberto Harriet, established in Buenos Aires in 1964, and states that its aims included supporting scientific, educational, artistic, social and philanthropic projects, as well as promoting the education of students, professionals and researchers.

English-language accounts of the Moconá Falls also credit Harriet with donating the land that formed the original reserve in Misiones Province.
